This article lists the Zulu monarchs, including chieftains and kings of the Zulu royal family from their earliest known history up to the present time.

Pre-Zulu
The Zulu King lineage stretches to as far as Luzumana, who is believed to have lived as long ago as the 16th century. Luzumana is the child of Ngoni, but details about him are unknown.

 NkosinKulu
 Mnguni kaNkosinKulu
 Luzumana kaMnguni
 Malandela kaLuzumana

Chieftains of the Zulus ( 1700–1818)
When Malandela died, he divided the kingdom into two clans, the Qwabe and the Zulu.

 Zulu I kaMalandela ( 1627 –  1709), founder of the clan
 Nkosinkulu kaZulu I
 Ntombela kaNkosinkulu
 Zulu II kaNtombela
 Gumede kaZulu
 Phunga kaGumede ( 1657 –  1727)
 Mageba kaGumede ( 1667 –  1745), son of Gumede, chief  1727 to  1745
 Ndaba kaMageba, son of Mageba, chief  1745 to 1763
 Jama kaNdaba ( 1727–1781), son of Ndaba, chief 1763 to 1781
 Mkabayi kaJama ( 1750 – 1843), daughter of Jama, regent 1781 to 1787 (until Senzangakhona came of age)
 Senzangakhona kaJama ( 1762–1816), son of Jama, chief 1787 to 1816
 Sigujana kaSenzangakhona, son of Senzangakhona, chief  1816
 Shaka kaSenzangakhona (1787–1828), son of Senzangakhona, chief  1816 to 1818

Kings of the Zulus ( 1818–present)
After Dingiswayo's death at the hands of Zwide, king of the Ndwandwe, around 1818, Shaka assumed leadership of the remnants of the Mthethwa Paramountcy, thereby becoming king.

Zulu Kingdom (Independent, 1816–1879)

Zululand (Dependency, 1883–present)

Timeline

See also
 Zulu Kingdom

References

Zulu

Zulu kings